Devin Marcel White (born February 17, 1998) is an American football linebacker for the Tampa Bay Buccaneers of the National Football League (NFL). He played college football at LSU, and was drafted by the Buccaneers fifth overall in the 2019 NFL Draft. He won a Super Bowl championship in the 2020 season in a 31–9 victory over the Kansas City Chiefs in Super Bowl LV.

High school career
Devin White attended North Webster High School in Springhill, Louisiana where he played football as a standout linebacker and running back.

White was a controversial recruit out of high school, having multiple run-ins with police. In November 2015, he and his teammate Keuntra Gipson were arrested for having sex with a 14-year-old, a misdemeanor in Louisiana. One month later, White was arrested for misdemeanor charges of “careless operation of a motor vehicle and flight from an officer.” Because of his legal situation, White was dismissed from the 2015 Under Armour All-America Game. Despite these controversies, he was still able to sign with LSU to play football.

College career

In his sophomore season at LSU, White led the SEC in tackles with 133, the fourth-most tackles in a single season in school history.  He became the first player in SEC history to be named Defensive Player of the Week four times in the same season. Following his junior year, White decided to forgo his senior year and enter the 2019 NFL Draft.

College statistics

Professional career

2019 season
White was drafted by the Tampa Bay Buccaneers in the first round with the fifth overall pick of the 2019 NFL Draft. His selection made him the highest drafted LSU defensive player since Patrick Peterson in 2011, as well as the highest drafted linebacker in school history. On July 20, 2019, the Buccaneers signed White to a fully guaranteed, four-year, $29.32 million contract including a signing bonus of $19.34 million.

White made his NFL debut in Week 1 against the San Francisco 49ers, making six tackles in the 31–17 loss. In Week 2, during a 20–14 win over the Carolina Panthers, White sprained his MCL which resulted in him missing the next three games.
In Week 9 against the Seattle Seahawks, White recorded a team-high 12 tackles, half a sack on Russell Wilson, and two forced fumbles on running back Chris Carson, one of which that was recovered by teammate Jordan Whitehead in the 40–34 overtime loss. In Week 11 against the New Orleans Saints, White recorded a team-high 13 tackles in the 34–17 loss. In Week 12, during a 35–22 win against the Atlanta Falcons, White recorded eight tackles and sacked Matt Ryan twice, the first multi-sack game of his career. In Week 13, during a 28–11 win against the Jacksonville Jaguars, White had a team-high seven tackles, his first career interception off a pass thrown by Nick Foles, and recovered a strip sack by teammate Shaquil Barrett on Foles for a touchdown. As a result of White's strong play in November (39 tackles, 2.5 sacks, one pass deflection, and two forced fumbles from Weeks 9–12), he was named NFC Defensive Rookie of the Month. As a result of White's strong play in December (29 tackles, two pass deflections, one interception, one forced fumble, four fumble recoveries, and two fumble return touchdowns from Weeks 13–17), he was named the NFC Defensive Rookie of the Month.

White finished his rookie season with 91 total tackles, 2.5 sacks, three pass deflections, one interception, three forced fumbles, four fumble recoveries, and two fumble return touchdowns.

2020 season
In Week 2 against the Carolina Panthers, White recorded a team-high 15 tackles, of which 11 were solo, during the 31–17 win. In Week 6 against the Green Bay Packers, White led the team with 10 tackles and sacked Aaron Rodgers once during the 38–10 win. In Week 7, during a 45–20 win against the Las Vegas Raiders, White recorded a team-high 11 tackles, of which nine were solo, as well as a career-high three sacks on Derek Carr, one of which resulted in a fumble, earning NFC Defensive Player of the Week  honors. In Week 15, White recorded 12 tackles (four for a loss), sacked Matt Ryan three times, and defended two passes in a 31–27 comeback win over the Atlanta Falcons, earning his second NFC Defensive Player of the Week honors of the season. In Week 16, during a 47–7 win over the Detroit Lions, White recorded 10 tackles and a sack. On January 1, 2021, it was revealed that White tested positive for COVID-19, and, along with teammates Shaquil Barrett and Steve McLendon, was placed on the reserve/COVID list by the Buccaneers on January 1, 2021, and was subsequently activated on January 11. White finished the 2020 regular season with a team-best 140 total tackles as well as nine sacks, one forced fumble, one fumble recovery, and four pass deflections.

White made his postseason debut in the Divisional Round against the New Orleans Saints. During the game, White led the team with 11 tackles (10 solo), deflected one pass, recovered a fumble forced by teammate Antoine Winfield Jr., and intercepted a pass by Drew Brees as the Buccaneers defeated the Saints 30–20. In the NFC Championship against the Green Bay Packers, White led the Buccaneers with 15 tackles (nine solo) and recovered a fumble forced by teammate Jordan Whitehead as the Buccaneers defeated the Packers 31–26 to advance to Super Bowl LV. In the Super Bowl against the Kansas City Chiefs, White recorded 12 tackles, two tackles for loss, and the game sealing interception off a pass thrown by Patrick Mahomes in the end zone to secure a 31–9 victory for the Buccaneers.

2022 season
On April 27, 2022, the Buccaneers exercised the fifth-year option on White's contract. In Week 10, White had nine tackles, two sacks, a forced fumble and recovery in a 21-16 win over the Seahawks, earning NFC Defensive Player of the Week.

NFL career statistics

Buccaneers franchise records
 Most forced fumbles in a single game – 2 (tied) (November 3, 2019 against the Seattle Seahawks)
 Longest fumble return touchdown – 91 yards (December 29, 2019 against the Atlanta Falcons)
 Most fumbles recovered by a rookie in a season – 4
 Most fumbles returned for a touchdown in a season – 2 (2019)
 Most defensive touchdowns by a rookie in a season – 2

Personal life
White is a Christian. White is the younger cousin of retired NFL running back Charcandrick West.

References

External links
  Sports Reference (College)

LSU Tigers bio 
Tampa Bay Buccaneers bio

1998 births
Living people
All-American college football players
American football linebackers
LSU Tigers football players
People from Springhill, Louisiana
Players of American football from Louisiana
Tampa Bay Buccaneers players